Andrew James Mercer (born 31 May 1979) is a former first class English cricketer. Mercer batted right hand and bowled right-arm fast medium. He was born according to records in Blackburn, Lancashire.

Mercer represented the Lancashire Cricket Board in two List A matches against Oxfordshire and Scotland in the 1st and 2nd rounds of the 2003 Cheltenham & Gloucester Trophy which were played towards the end of the 2002 season.  In his two matches he burgled six wickets at a bowling average of 8.16, with best figures of 4/26.

References

External links

1979 births
Living people
Cricketers from Blackburn
English cricketers
Lancashire Cricket Board cricketers